Dreamt for Light Years in the Belly of a Mountain is the fourth and final album by Sparklehorse before Mark Linkous' death in 2010. It was released on September 25, 2006 by Astralwerks Records.

Recording

After the release of 2001's It's a Wonderful Life, Linkous slowly began recording the tracks that would become Dreamt for Light Years in the Belly of a Mountain at his Static King Studio in North Carolina. He would later tell an interviewer that his depression had stalled the creation of the album, stretching the recording process out to about five years. In 2006, he told Pitchfork Media that many of the songs that made up Dreamt for Light Years''' track listing were actually songs that had been cut from It's a Wonderful Life: "Well, I'd quit working for a while and it started to get really difficult to live and pay the rent. So it was really getting down to the wire where I had to turn a record in. I had some stuff written that I didn't put on the last album, because they were just really pop songs. They felt like anachronisms on the last record. So I saved all these little pop songs."

After hearing 2004's The Grey Album, which mashed up Jay-Z's The Black Album and the Beatles' The White Album, Linkous invited the album's producer, Danger Mouse, to come to North Carolina and help him finish the tracks he had begun recording.

Although it was Sparklehorse's first studio album in five years, approximately 25 minutes of the 55-minute-long record were released in some form previously, dating from the sessions for the It's a Wonderful Life album. "Ghost in the Sky" was originally released on the Japanese pressing of It's a Wonderful Life. "Shade and Honey" appeared on a joint 7" split-single with the Shins and Mates of State. "Shade and Honey" was also sung by the actor Alessandro Nivola in the 2002 film Laurel Canyon, and Nivola's version is also found on the soundtrack. "Morning Hollow" was previously found as the hidden bonus track on It's a Wonderful Life.  The track "Dreamt for Lightyears in the Belly of a Mountain" was originally released in 2001 under the title "Maxine" on both the LP version of It's a Wonderful Life and on the Gold Day EP.

"Ghost in the Sky," "Don't Take My Sunshine Away," and "Knives of Summertime" were released as singles in the weeks leading up to the release of the album.

Album cover

The album cover was created by artist Robert Pokorny. The image that would eventually wind up as the record cover was originally made for a promotional poster for a Sparklehorse in-store concert at Fingerprints Records in Long Beach, California. Linkous later said that he "loved that image from the first time I saw it, and I just knew that was going to be the cover of the next album... {Pokorny} really has a great sense of realizing imagery from the music he listens to. I can't really describe anything about that image that represents anything specific in the music, but it just really seems to fit to me."

Reception

The album garnered mostly positive reviews (notably from Pitchfork Media, Los Angeles Times and Entertainment Weekly'')

Track listing
 "Don't Take My Sunshine Away" – 3:05
Mark Linkous – voice, guitar, bass, synthesizer, strings
Danger Mouse – sampler, drum programming
Sophie Michelitsianos – voice
Scott Minor – drums
Steven Drozd – drums
 "Getting It Wrong" – 2:16
Mark Linkous – voice, electric piano, bass, sampler, drums, pump organ, optigan
Danger Mouse – organ, sampler, drum programming
 "Shade and Honey" – 4:08
Mark Linkous – all instruments
 "See the Light" – 3:42
Mark Linkous – voice, guitar
Scott Minor – drums, electronics
Dave Fridmann – bass
Steven Drozd – echo guitar
Melissa Moore – violin
 "Return to Me" – 3:18
Mark Linkous – voice, classical guitar, sampler, chamberlin
Alan Weatherhead – pump organ, lap steel guitar
Johnny Hott – piano
 "Some Sweet Day" – 4:20
Mark Linkous – all instruments
 "Ghost in the Sky" – 3:28
Mark Linkous – all instruments
 "Mountains" – 3:42
Mark Linkous – voice, guitar, sampler, bass
Danger Mouse – organ, sampler
Johnny Hott – drums
 "Morning Hollow" – 7:23
Mark Linkous – voice, baritone guitar, e-Bow Guitar
Dave Fridmann – vibraphone, wurlitzer piano
James SK Wān – voice, clarinet
Sophie Michelitsianos – voice
Scott Minor – drums, harmonium
Tom Waits – piano
Joan Wasser – violin
Jane Scarpantoni – cello
 "It's Not So Hard" – 2:52
Mark Linkous – voice, guitar
Dave Fridmann – bass
Steven Drozd – drums
 "Knives of Summertime" – 4:19
Mark Linkous – voice, guitar, sampler, tape loops
Matthew Linkous – guitar
Melissa Moore – bass, violin
Scott Minor – drums, electronics
Tim Regan – piano
 "Dreamt for Light Years in the Belly of a Mountain" – 10:35
Mark Linkous – piano, guitar loop, chamberlin, orchestron
Dave Fridmann – mellotron, chamberlin
Scott Minor – casio, electronics
Rex White – pedal steel

References 

2006 albums
Albums produced by Danger Mouse (musician)
Astralwerks albums
Albums produced by Dave Fridmann
Sparklehorse albums
Albums recorded at Tarbox Road Studios